Priddy Glacier is a glacier, 2 nautical miles (3.7 km) long, on the west side of Esser Hill, flowing northwest to join Hobbs Glacier, on Scott Coast, Victoria Land. Named in 1992 by Advisory Committee on Antarctic Names (US-ACAN) after Allan R. Priddy of Holmes and Narver, Inc., who experienced one winter above 76 in Greenland and one below 76 at McMurdo Station, as well as several summer seasons in Antarctica from 1969–91. He was construction foreman at four geological field camps and for four summer seasons at South Pole Station, and was a key crew member in the building of both Siple I and Siple II Stations.

Glaciers of Scott Coast